Eugene International High School is a high school located in Eugene, Oregon, United States. Part of the Eugene School District, it is an alternative school in international studies located at its three host schools: South Eugene High School, Sheldon High School, and Churchill High School.  Students are given a global perspective in the course of study and are required to take a foreign language. Its instruction meets requirements for the International Baccalaureate Program, however it does not require students to pursue the full diploma program. The subjects covered by the school include literature, history, geography, social studies, and health, while math, science, foreign language, physical education, and electives are covered by its host schools. Immersion programs are available at South and Sheldon in French and Spanish, respectively.

Location
Eugene International High School is hosted by three traditional high schools in the area:
Sheldon High School 
South Eugene High School 
Churchill High School

External links

Eugene International High School

High schools in Lane County, Oregon
Education in Eugene, Oregon
International Baccalaureate schools in Oregon
Alternative schools in Oregon
Educational institutions established in 1984
Public high schools in Oregon
1984 establishments in Oregon